Bozhidar Pampoulov (born 29 April 1949) is a Bulgarian former professional tennis player.

Biography
Born in Plovdiv, Pampoulov was a regular member of the Bulgaria Davis Cup team from 1967 to 1982, featuring in 17 Davis Cup ties. He played most of his doubles rubbers with his twin brother Matei, who he would partner in tournaments throughout his career. They went 5–9 in Davis Cup doubles matches together, a Bulgarian record for wins.

Pampoulov made appearances in the qualifying draws for the French Open and Wimbledon during the 1970s. 

At 31 years old, he made his ATP debut at the 1980 Sofia Open. He was also a quarterfinalist at the Sofia Open in the next 1981 edition, which was his best performance in a Grand Prix tournament.

Both his son Luben and niece Elena were professional tennis players.

References

External links
 
 
 

1949 births
Living people
Bulgarian male tennis players
Twin sportspeople
Bulgarian twins
Sportspeople from Plovdiv
Universiade medalists in tennis
Universiade silver medalists for Bulgaria
Universiade bronze medalists for Bulgaria
20th-century Bulgarian people